Utricularia olivacea, the piedmont bladderwort, is a very small, annual suspended aquatic carnivorous plant that belongs to the genus Utricularia. Utricularia olivacea is native to Central America, South America, the West Indies, and the eastern United States (coastal plain from Mississippi to New Jersey).

See also 
 List of Utricularia species

References 

Carnivorous plants of Central America
Carnivorous plants of North America
Carnivorous plants of South America
Flora of South America
Flora of Central America
Flora of the Caribbean
Aquatic plants
Plants described in 1866
olivacea
Flora of the Southeastern United States
Flora of the Northeastern United States
Flora without expected TNC conservation status